In mathematics, an approximate group is a subset of a group which behaves like a subgroup "up to a constant error", in a precise quantitative sense (so the term approximate subgroup may be more correct). For example, it is required that the set of products of elements in the subset be not much bigger than the subset itself (while for a subgroup it is required that they be equal). The notion was introduced in the 2010s but can be traced to older sources in additive combinatorics.

Formal definition 

A non-empty subset  is a -approximate subgroup of  if: 
 It is symmetric, that is if  then ; 
 There exists a subset  of cardinality  such that . 
It is immediately verified that a 1-approximate subgroup is the same thing as a genuine subgroup. In applications it is often used with  being fixed and  going to infinity.

Examples of approximate subgroups which are not groups are given by symmetric intervals and more generally arithmetic progressions in the integers.

A more general example is given by balls in the word metric in finitely generated nilpotent groups.

Classification of approximate subgroups 

Approximate subgroups of the integer group  were completely classified by Imre Z. Ruzsa and Freiman. The result is stated as follows: 
For any  there are  such that for any -approximate subgroup  there exists a generalised arithmetic progression  generated by at most  integers and containing at least  elements, such that . 
The constants  can be estimated sharply.

The work of Breuillard–Green–Tao (the culmination of an effort started a few years earlier by various other people) is a vast generalisation of this result. In a very general form its statement is the following: 
Let ; there exists  such that the following holds.
The statement also gives some information on the characteristics (rank and step) of the nilpotent group .

In the case where  is a finite matrix group the results can be made more precise, for instance: 
Let .
In some sense this says that there are no interesting approximate subgroups (besides genuine subgroups) in finite simple linear groups (they are either "trivial", that is very small, or "not proper", that is almost equal to the whole group).

Applications 

The Breuillard–Green–Tao theorem on classification of approximate groups can be used to give a new proof of Gromov's theorem on groups of polynomial growth.

Other applications are to the construction of expander graphs from the Cayley graphs of finite simple groups, and to the related topic of superstrong approximation.

Notes

References 

Group theory
Geometric group theory
Additive combinatorics